Janowski (feminine: Janowska; plural: Janowscy) is a Polish surname. It is related to a number of surnames in other languages.

Related surnames

People

Janowski/Janowska
 Adam Janowski (born 1987), English rugby league player
 Alina Janowska (1923–2017), Polish actress
 Bronisława Janowska (1868–1953), Polish painter and publisher
 Chaim Janowski (1867–1935), Polish-Jewish chess master, brother of Dawid
 Claire Janowski, American politician
 Dawid Janowski (1868–1927), Polish chess master, brother of Chaim
 Gabriel Janowski (born 1947), Polish politician
 Janusz Janowski (born 1965), Polish artist and musician
 Jarosław Janowski (born 1967), Polish rower
 Maciej Janowski (born 1991), Polish speedway rider
 Marek Janowski (born 1939), Polish-born conductor
 Max Janowski (1912–1991), Polish composer of Jewish liturgical music
 Mieczysław Janowski (born 1947), Polish politician
 Piotr Janowski (1951–2008), Polish violinist
 Sylwester Janowski (born 1976), Polish footballer
 Werner von Janowski (c.1903–1978), German Nazi spy
 Wioletta Janowska (born 1977), Polish runner
 Wojciech Janowski (born 1949), Polish-Monegasque businessman and diplomat

Yanovsky/Yanovskaya/etc.
 Aleksandr Yanovsky (born 1952), Russian footballer
 Anna Yanovskaya (born 1996), Russian ice dancer
 Avrom Yanovsky (1911–1979), Canadian editorial cartoonist
 Chana Schneerson (née Yanovsky; 1880–1964), wife of Levi Yitzchak Schneerson and mother of Menachem Mendel Schneerson
 Igor Yanovsky (born 1974), Russian footballer
 Nikki Yanofsky (born 1994), Canadian musician
 Rudolph Yanovskiy (1929–2010), Russian philosopher
 Saul Yanovsky (1864–1939), American anarchist 
 Semyon Yanovsky (1788–1876), Russian naval officer
 Sofya Yanovskaya (1896–1966), Soviet mathematician and historian 
 Vasyl Gogol-Yanovsky (1777–1825), Ukrainian playwright and poet, father of Nikolai Gogol
 Vyacheslav Yanovskiy (born 1957), Belarusian boxer
 Zal Yanovsky (1944–2002), Canadian rock musician

See also
 
 
 Yanofsky, alternate romanization.
 Janowski Don Kichot, a Polish ultralight aircraft
 Jankowski

Polish-language surnames